Federal elections were held in Switzerland on 28 October 1928. Although the Social Democratic Party received the most votes (by a margin of just six votes), the Free Democratic Party remained the largest party in the National Council, winning 58 of the 198 seats.

Results

National Council

By constituency

Council of States
In several cantons the members of the Council of States were chosen by the cantonal parliaments.

By canton

References

1928 elections in Europe
1928 in Switzerland
Federal elections in Switzerland
Federal
October 1928 events